In Greek mythology, Ancaeus (Ancient Greek: Ἀγκαῖος Ankaîos) was both an Argonaut and a participant in the Calydonian Boar hunt, in which he met his end.

Family 
Ancaeus was the son of King Lycurgus of Arcadia either by Cleophyle or Eurynome or Antinoe. Ancaeus married Iotis and became the father of Agapenor who led the Arcadian forces during the Trojan War.

Mythology 
Ancaeus' arms were ominously hidden at home, but he set forth, dressed in a bearskin and armed only with a labrys (λάβρυς "doubled-bladed axe").

Notes

References 
 Apollodorus, The Library with an English Translation by Sir James George Frazer, F.B.A., F.R.S. in 2 Volumes, Cambridge, MA, Harvard University Press; London, William Heinemann Ltd. 1921. ISBN 0-674-99135-4. Online version at the Perseus Digital Library. Greek text available from the same website.
Pausanias, Description of Greece with an English Translation by W.H.S. Jones, Litt.D., and H.A. Ormerod, M.A., in 4 Volumes. Cambridge, MA, Harvard University Press; London, William Heinemann Ltd. 1918. . Online version at the Perseus Digital Library
Pausanias, Graeciae Descriptio. 3 vols. Leipzig, Teubner. 1903.  Greek text available at the Perseus Digital Library.

Princes in Greek mythology
Argonauts
Suitors of Helen
Characters in the Argonautica
Deaths due to boar attacks
Arcadian characters in Greek mythology